= Orlando City =

Orlando City may refer to:

- Orlando, Florida, a city in the U.S. state of Florida
- Orlando City SC (2010–14), an American professional soccer club in Orlando, Florida, that played in the USL Pro league
- Orlando City SC, an American professional soccer club in Orlando, Florida, a Major League Soccer (MLS) franchise
